The Women's downhill competition at the FIS Alpine World Ski Championships 2019 was held on Sunday, 10 February.

In the final event of her international career, Lindsey Vonn of the United States won the bronze medal, a half-second behind repeat champion Ilka Štuhec of Slovenia, and Switzerland's Corinne Suter took the silver.

Results
The race started at 12:30 CET (UTC+1).

References

Women's downhill